The 1996–97 NBA season was the Clippers' 27th season in the National Basketball Association, 13th in Los Angeles and 3rd in which they played occasional home games in Anaheim. The Clippers had the seventh pick in the 1996 NBA draft, and selected Lorenzen Wright from the University of Memphis. During the off-season, the team signed free agents Darrick Martin, and former All-Star center Kevin Duckworth. With the loss of Brian Williams to free agency, the Clippers were expected to sink in the bottom of the NBA again. After a 6–4 start to the season, the team lost ten of their next eleven games, as Duckworth only played just 26 games due to a sore heel injury, and Stanley Roberts only played just 18 games due to a herniated disk injury. However, with the continued solid play of Loy Vaught, who once again led the team in scoring and rebounding, the Clippers held a 19–25 record at the All-Star break, and managed to slip into the playoffs as the No. 8 seed in the Western Conference with a below .500 record of 36–46, fifth in the Pacific Division.

Vaught led the team with 14.9 points and 10.0 rebounds per game, while Malik Sealy averaged 13.5 points and 1.6 steals per game, and Rodney Rogers provided the team with 13.2 points and 5.1 rebounds per game. In addition, Martin contributed 10.9 points and 4.1 assists per game, and Wright provided with 7.3 points and 6.1 rebounds per game. Off the bench, Roberts averaged 9.5 points, 5.1 rebounds and 1.3 blocks per game, while Bo Outlaw provided with 7.6 points, 5.5 rebounds and 1.7 blocks per game, second-year guard Brent Barry contributed 7.5 points per game, but only played 59 games due to a thumb injury, and Lamond Murray contributed 7.4 points per game.

However, in the Western Conference First Round of the playoffs, the Clippers were swept by the top-seeded Utah Jazz in three straight games. The Jazz would reach the NBA Finals for the first time, but would lose to the defending champion Chicago Bulls in six games. This would also be the Clippers' final playoff appearance until 2006. 

Following the season, Sealy signed as a free agent with the Detroit Pistons, while Roberts was traded to the Minnesota Timberwolves, Outlaw signed with the Orlando Magic, Terry Dehere signed with the Sacramento Kings, and Duckworth retired.

Draft picks

Roster

Roster Notes
A number of players from the 1996–97 roster have either died prematurely, or ended up in unfortunate circumstances; these players are:

Center Stanley Roberts (banned from the NBA for drug use in 1999).
Guard Malik Sealy (died in an automobile accident in 2000 at age 30).
Center Kevin Duckworth (died of heart failure in 2008 at age 44).
Forward Rodney Rogers (became paralyzed after a dirt bike accident in 2008 at age 37).
Center Lorenzen Wright (murdered by his ex-wife in 2010 at age 34).
Center Dwayne Schintzius (died from cancer complications in 2012 at age 43).

Interestingly enough, one player, Brent Barry, would enjoy a long and productive career in the NBA, winning two titles (2005 and 2007) with the San Antonio Spurs, as well as being a consistent starter for the Seattle SuperSonics in the 2000s, but was divorced from his wife Erin in 2011, allegedly due to an extra-marital affair with his Spurs teammate Tony Parker.

Regular season

Season standings

z – clinched division title
y – clinched division title
x – clinched playoff spot

Record vs. opponents

Game log

Playoffs

|- align="center" bgcolor="#ffcccc"
| 1
| April 24
| @ Utah
| L 86–106
| Loy Vaught (20)
| Loy Vaught (11)
| three players tied (3)
| Delta Center19,911
| 0–1
|- align="center" bgcolor="#ffcccc"
| 2
| April 26
| @ Utah
| L 99–105
| Lorenzen Wright (17)
| Loy Vaught (9)
| Darrick Martin (6)
| Delta Center19,911
| 0–2
|- align="center" bgcolor="#ffcccc"
| 3
| April 28
| Utah
| L 92–104
| Loy Vaught (20)
| Vaught, Wright (9)
| Darrick Martin (5)
| Los Angeles Memorial Sports Arena11,747
| 0–3
|-

Player statistics

Season

Playoffs

Awards and records

Transactions
The Clippers have been involved in the following transactions during the 1996–97 season.

Trades
No trades occurred for this team this season.

Free agents

Additions

Subtractions

Player Transactions Citation:

See also
 1996–97 NBA season

References

Los Angeles Clippers seasons